Sawridge 150H is an Indian reserve of the Sawridge First Nation in Alberta, located within the Municipal District of Lesser Slave River No. 124. It is west of the town of Slave Lake.

The area around Sawridge 150H is mostly unpopulated, with less than two inhabitants per square kilometer.  The warmest month is July, when the with average temperature 16 °C, and the coldest is December with average temperature −14 °C

References

Indian reserves in Alberta